Greg Rose (born 26 March 1980), better known by his stage name Perfect Giddimani, Mr. Perfect or simply Perfect is a Jamaican reggae singer. Who has gained worldwide recognition for his reggae hit "Hand Cart Bwoy" which entered the Jamaican charts in 2004 and created a wave of support for local peddlers who ply their wares in the markets and on the streets.

Biography 
Perfect (born Greg Rose) is the third child in a family of four children. He grew up in Bamboo, a community located in the parish of St. Ann, Jamaica. Perfect recorded his first tune as Little Ninja, before changing his stage name to Mr. Perfect then subsequently Perfect Giddimani.

Perfect Giddimani began deejaying on a sound system called "Trend Setter" which originated in Bamboo where he lived. It was for this sound system that he recorded his first set of dubplates. He attended York Castle High School before relocating to Kingston. The first song that highlighted his name was "Lock Me Up" in 2004 but his break through came with "Hand Cart Bwoy" in 2005. He released his first album Giddimani, the next year. The Austrian record label Irie vibrations released his second album Born Dead With Life, in 2008.

In April 2017, Perfect Giddimani was featured on  Young Shanty's EP titled Chalice Row or Dig a Hole which debuted on Billboard's Reggae Album Charts at Number 1. This EP was produced by Giddimani Records, founded in late 2009 by Rose, in collaboration with Chalice Row Unlimited based in California.

On 7 July 2017, Perfect Giddimani released his 11th studio album titled Live My Life Again. This fifteen track album released by Giddimani Records, debuted at number 1 on Billboard's Reggae Albums chart for the week of 2 September 2017. It spent 3 consecutive weeks on the charts going from 1 to 5 then up to 3 as the charts greatest gainer for the week of 16 September 2017. This album also entered the Billboard Independent albums chart peaking at 38.

Awards and Accomplishments

Billboard Chart Appearances

Discography

Albums

Singles

Mixtapes
2008: 30 Pieces 
2009: Dear Mr. President
2009: The Perfect Mixtape 
2011: Giddimani Nah Drop

References

External links
Perfect Giddimani's Webpage
Perfect Giddimani Discography at Discogs.com

Living people
Jamaican male singers
Jamaican reggae singers
1980 births
Converts to the Rastafari movement
Performers of Rastafarian music
Reggae fusion artists
Jamaican Rastafarians
Jamaican reggae musicians
People from Saint Ann Parish